Psidium sartorianum is a species of tree in the family Myrtaceae. It is native to North and South America.  In much of Mexico it is called guayabillo; the Maya call it niedenzu and pichi' che' . In English it is called little guava. P. sartorianum is described as producing fruits up to an inch in diameter (2.5 cm) -- much smaller than the cultivated guava (Psidium guajava) -- but tasting something like regular guava fruits.

References

External links
Psidium sartorianum (O. Berg) Nied., An Indigenous Plant to Mexico, from Biology to Biological Activity by Francisco Delgado-Vargas

Trees of Peru
sartorianum
Trees of Mexico
Trees of Cuba
Trees of Panama
Trees of Bolivia
Trees of Brazil
Trees of Costa Rica